{{DISPLAYTITLE:C10H6O3}}
The molecular formula C10H6O3 (molar mass: 174.15 g/mol, exact mass: 174.0317 u) may refer to:

 Juglone, or 5-hydroxy-1,4-naphthalenedione
 Lawsone, or 2-hydroxy-1,4-naphthoquinone